Đoàn Minh Phượng (born 1956, in Saigon, South Vietnam) is a noted film director from Vietnam. She is best known for her 2005 film Bride of Silence (Hạt mưa rơi bao lâu), which played at several overseas film festivals.

References

External links

Đoàn Minh Phượng interview

1956 births
Living people
People from Ho Chi Minh City
Vietnamese film directors
Vietnamese women film directors
21st-century Vietnamese women